Corydalus affinis is a species of dobsonfly in the genus Corydalus. It is found in Argentina, Bolivia, Brazil, Colombia, Ecuador, French Guiana, Guyana, Paraguay, Peru, and Venezuela. It is found mainly in Amazonian lowlands. Forewing length ranges from 32-58 millimeters, with the females slightly larger than the males.

References

Corydalidae